The  is an electric multiple unit (EMU) train type operated by the private railway operator Kintetsu Railway since 1966 on many of its commuter lines in the Kansai area of Japan.

Design 
First introduced in 1966, the design is based on the Kintetsu 1480 series commuter train, also manufactured by Kinki Sharyo. All trainsets run on standard gauge  tracks.

The trainsets incorporate improvements in the 1M1T formations and derivatives.

Variants 

 2400 series: 2-car sets primarily used on the Osaka Line
 2410 series: 2-car sets built equipped with increased air circulation
 2430 series: 3-car and 4-car sets primarily used on Osaka Line semi-express services
 2444 series: 3-car sets modified for single operator "wanman" operation

2400 series 

The 2400 series was the base variant in the 2400 series family. Introduced in 1966, these cars were never refurbished, although a few techinal upgrades did occur in the mid 1980s.

Formation 
The six two-car sets were formed as follows.

Interior 
Seating consisted of longitudinal seating throughout, as was with the later variants.

Disposal 
From 1998 to January 2004, all of the trains in the series were scrapped. Some motor and cab equipment would later be reused some Kintetsu non-passenger trains.

2410 series 

The 2410 series are 2400 series sets with modifications to the location of various onboard equipment, including the installation of a cross-flow fan. Three-car sets are re-fitted for wanman driver-only operation.

Formations 
The 2-car sets are formed as follows.

Refurbishment 
All cars were refurbished from 1996 to 2002. Air conditioning was installed as part of the upgrade.

Interior 
Seating consists of longitudinal seating throughout.

Gallery

2430 series 

The 2430 series started appearing in 1973. All trains remain in service.

Formations 
The three-car sets are formed as follows.

The four-car sets are formed as follows. Over the years, car 3 has resulted in various reconfigurations including former 1480 series cars. This was to resolve operational issues with slopes on the Osaka Line.

Refurbishment 
The sets were refurbished between 1988 and 1995.

Interior 
Seating consists of longitudinal seating throughout, like the other variants.

Gallery

2444 series 

This sub-series consists of two 3-car sets remodeled for "Wanman" one-person operation.

Formations 
The 3-car sets are formed as follows.

Modifications 
Modifications for "Wanman" operation took place at Koan Depot.

Interior 
Seating consists of longitudinal seating throughout.

References 

Electric multiple units of Japan
2400 series

1500 V DC multiple units of Japan
Kinki Sharyo multiple units